The Francilienne is a partially completed ring road in Île-de-France (the région that includes Paris), France, lying outside the A86.

Started in 1970, existing segments cover about two-thirds of the ring, under different names (A104, N104, N184). Construction of the western sections, which would complete the Francilienne, was projected in the late 2000s to take place between 2011 and 2015. All future construction is to be to motorway standard and designated as A104 only.

However, in June 2013, the 'Mobilité 21' National Infrastructure Priority report pushed completion of the western section beyond 2021 and possibly 2030, relegating the Francilienne to a low-priority (second class) national infrastructure project (along with €80 billion worth of other road, rail, and river/port projects), behind €30 billion in high-priority (first class) projects likely to be the only ones built in France between 2017 and 2030, under currently projected budgetary constraints.

The southeastern portion of the Francilienne, the N104 between the A4 and A6, is severely congested and carries a high percentage of heavy goods vehicle (HGV) traffic. As of 2013, some portions of the N104 in the vicinity of the A4 were widened to six lanes (three each way). The French government has not yet designated any of the lanes as high-occupancy vehicle lanes.

The Francilienne is the third Paris ring road, outside the A86 super-périphérique, which in turn is outside the Parisian Boulevard Périphérique.

Outside the Francilienne itself is the very large, 1100 km-long, and incomplete Grand Contournement outer ring, the southeastern portion of which had yet to be constructed as of 2019.

Exit list

Exits are numbered in a clockwise (inner) direction.

See also
 Boulevard Périphérique
 A86 autoroute

External links
A104 autoroute in Saratlas
Francilienne.Net Overview and History (in French with embedded Google Translate to English)

References

A104
Ring roads in France